, there were about 800 electric vehicles in Nova Scotia.

Government policy
, the provincial government offered tax rebates of $3,000 for electric vehicle purchases.

Charging stations
, there were about 150 charging stations in Nova Scotia, with 14 DC charging stations.

Manufacturing
Nova Scotia has been proposed as a hub for the mining of materials for electric vehicles.

By region

Cape Breton
, there were 27 charging station locations on Cape Breton Island with 83 AC level 2 charging ports and two DC charging ports.

Halifax
, there were around 500 electric vehicles registered in the Halifax Regional Municipality.

References

Nova Scotia
Transport in Nova Scotia